Warda (Rose)  is a feminine given name and a surname. Notable people with the name are as follows:

Given name

First name
Warda Al-Jazairia (1939–2012), Algerian-French singer
Warda al Turk (1797–1873), Lebanese poet
Warda al-Yaziji (1838–1924), Lebanese poet

Middle name
Medina Warda Aulia (born 1997), Indonesian chess player

Surname
Amr Warda (born 1993), Egyptian football player
Bashar Warda (born 1969), Iraqi Chaldean Catholic cleric
Giwargis Warda, Syriac poet
Mahmoud Abu Warda (born 1995), Palestinian football player
Maryse Warda (born 1961), Egyptian Canadian translator
Mohsen Medhat Warda (born 1955), Egyptian basketball player
Pascal Esho Warda (born 1961), Iraqi Assyrian politician
William Warda (born 1961), Iraqi Assyrian journalist 
Yussuf Abu-Warda (born 1953), Arab-Israeli actor

Arabic feminine given names
Surnames of Arabic origin